Folketing elections were held in Denmark on 25 June 1884.

Results

References

Mackie, Thomas T. & Rose, Richard (1974). The International Almanac of Electoral History. London: Macmillan, p. 88.
Møller, P. (1950). Politisk haandbog: en samling konkrete oplysninger (in Danish). Copenhagen: Hagerup, p. 308.

Elections in Denmark
Denmark
Folketing election
Denmark